Audrey La Rizza (born 21 April 1981) is a French judoka, who competes in the half-lightweight category (−52 kg). She won a gold medal at the 2003 Summer Universiade and a silver at the 2007 European Judo Championships in Belgrade, Serbia. She is also a member of US Orleans Judo Club, and is coached and trained by Christophe Brunet and Cathy Fleury.

At the 2008 Olympics she lost the first preliminary match to Olympic bronze medalist Ilse Heylen of Belgium.

References

External links
 
 

 NBC Olympics Profile

French female judoka
Living people
Olympic judoka of France
Judoka at the 2008 Summer Olympics
Sportspeople from Grenoble
1981 births
Universiade medalists in judo
Universiade gold medalists for France
Medalists at the 2003 Summer Universiade
21st-century French women